James David Holt (born 15 January 1956) is an English-born actor who has appeared in many Australian television shows and films.

Holt is also a magician, and has had the opportunity to incorporate this talent into some of his television appearances. Well known productions in which he has appeared include Bodyline, Anzacs, Crocodile Dundee II, A Country Practice, Embassy, G. P., Heartbreak High, Wildside, and most recently in an episode of Packed to the Rafters (2009).

He is married to publishing executive Robyn Holt, and they have a daughter named Hannah. From around 2002 to early 2006, he was based in Russia while his wife was the Managing Director of Condé Nast Zao.

Filmography

Acting

References

External links

Bio details of Robyn Holt

1959 births
Living people
Australian male film actors
Australian male television actors
20th-century Australian male actors
21st-century Australian male actors
Male actors from Liverpool
English emigrants to Australia